Latimore Creek is a   tributary of the Bermudian Creek in Adams County and York County, Pennsylvania in the United States.

Latimore Creek joins the Bermudian Creek in Latimore Township.

See also
List of rivers of Pennsylvania

References

External links
U.S. Geological Survey: PA stream gaging stations

Rivers of Pennsylvania
Tributaries of the Susquehanna River
Rivers of Adams County, Pennsylvania